"Be Real" is a song recorded by Finnish singer Krista Siegfrids. The song was released as a digital download in Finland on 2 November 2016. The song peaked at number 80 on the Finnish Airplay Chart.

Music video
A music video to accompany the release of "Be Real" was first released onto YouTube on 18 November 2016 at a total length of three minutes and four seconds.

Track listing

Chart performance

Release history

References

2016 singles
2016 songs
Krista Siegfrids songs
Songs written by Krista Siegfrids